Sebastopol House Historic Site is an antebellum Greek Revival house built of concrete, located in Seguin, Texas, United States. Joshua W. Young built it between 1854 and 1856 for his sister, Catherine LeGette. Today Sebastopol is one of some 20 surviving buildings that give Seguin the largest concentration of early 19th century structures in the U.S.

As a result of its unusual concrete construction, Sebastopol House was included in the Historic American Buildings Survey (H.A.B.S.) in 1936, made a Registered Texas Historical Landmark in 1964, and then listed on the National Register of Historic Places on August 25, 1970. It is a prime example of the limecrete structures of Seguin. The house is constructed entirely of unreinforced cast-in-place concrete and it is one of the oldest and largest structures in the state using this building method.

This process was developed and patented by doctor and chemist John Park, who had moved to Seguin in 1846. But he soon had imitators and competitors, contractors like Joshua Young. Often slaves did the hard physical work, using boards to build forms, kept at the right width (12 to 18 inches) by screws and oak spacers when the limecrete mixture was poured into the forms, and allowed to harden. Then the forms were raised another foot or so and the process repeated.

A large part of the "Park's concrete" mix was caliche, a thick deposit of gravelly clay that underlies Seguin. Usually the caliche was dug out on site, providing a basement level, as at Sebastopol. The caliche was then mixed with sand, lime made from nearby limestone deposits, and organic materials like straw or horsehair. The exterior walls were usually whitewashed, and the interiors often had woodwork or wainscoting of local walnut, oak or pecan.

Joseph Zorn Jr. bought the house in 1874 and it remained in the Zorn family until 1961. Zorn was mayor of Seguin from 1890 to 1910, and played a major role in establishing the first system of free public schools in the town.

The Texas Parks and Wildlife Department acquired the house and grounds by purchase in 1976 from the Seguin Conservation Society, which by agreement had preserved the house until the state agency could get funds for the restoration in its budget. Sebastopol was again opened to the public in September 1989. The house is restored to its 1880s appearance. In 2011 ownership was transferred to the City of Seguin.

See also

National Register of Historic Places listings in Guadalupe County, Texas
Recorded Texas Historic Landmarks in Guadalupe County

References

External links

City of Seguin, Texas: Sebastopol House

Protected areas of Guadalupe County, Texas
Museums in Guadalupe County, Texas
Historic house museums in Texas
Tourist attractions in Seguin, Texas
Houses on the National Register of Historic Places in Texas
Greek Revival houses in Texas
Houses completed in 1856
Seguin, Texas
Houses in Guadalupe County, Texas
National Register of Historic Places in Guadalupe County, Texas